Clark Clifton Kellogg Jr. (born July 2, 1961) is an American former professional basketball player who is the lead college basketball analyst for CBS Sports. He played in the National Basketball Association (NBA) for the Indiana Pacers.

Basketball career

High school
Clark "Special K" Kellogg grew up in East Cleveland, Ohio, attended Chambers Elementary, W.H. Kirk Middle School (both in East Cleveland), and St. Joseph High School in Cleveland, Ohio, and had a high school basketball career generally regarded as one of the finest in Cleveland history. The highlight was a 74–65 loss in the 1979 state championship game to Columbus East that saw Kellogg score 51 points and grab 24 rebounds. His 51-point game is still an Ohio high school state finals record. Kellogg also played in the McDonald's All-American and Capital Classic games.

College
From 1979 to 1982, Kellogg played for the Ohio State University, where he earned All-Big Ten Conference and Most Valuable Player honors; in 1996, he received his marketing degree. In June 2010, Ohio Gov. Ted Strickland appointed Kellogg to the university's board of trustees, where he sits today.

NBA
In 1982, Kellogg declared for the NBA draft after his junior year of college and was a 1st round draft pick (8th overall) of the Indiana Pacers. In his first season, he was selected as a member of the NBA All-Rookie Team. He is one of only a handful of rookies in NBA history to average 20 points and 10 rebounds a game, having averaged 20.1 points, 10.6 rebounds, and 2.6 assists per game. Kellogg came in second place in NBA Rookie of the Year voting, losing to Terry Cummings, who is also one of the only four players to average 20 points and 10 rebounds in a rookie season and not make the Basketball Hall of Fame. Following his rookie year success, Kellogg was much heralded as the next breakout NBA superstar. Converse signed him to an endorsement deal, to release his own Converse "Special K" sneaker. However, he only played three full seasons, and portions of two others, for the Pacers before chronic knee problems forced him to retire. During his three full seasons with the Pacers, the Pacers were a combined 68–178.

Personal life
Kellogg has two sons, Alex and Nick, and a daughter, Talisa. Nick played basketball for Ohio University and Talisa played Division I volleyball at Georgia Tech.

Kellogg became a Christian in 1985 after questioning his "purpose in life." Kellogg has spoken about his faith saying, "...my faith remains my foundation. Christ is my all and the driver of my life."

Broadcasting career

ESPN
In 1990, he joined ESPN as a basketball analyst. He has also worked for the Big East Network and Prime Sports.

WTTV/FSN-Indiana
Kellogg served as a television analyst for Indiana Pacers road games.

CBS Sports
From 1993 to 1994, Kellogg served as a game analyst for the CBS Sports coverage of the NCAA tournament. From 1994 to 1997, he served as a studio co-host for the early round coverage of the NCAA Tournament. In 1997, Kellogg joined CBS Sports full-time as a studio/game analyst for college basketball coverage and was one of three in-studio hosts for March Madness along with Greg Gumbel and Sports Illustrated's Seth Davis. He would typically work as the #2 game analyst until around Championship Week when he would move into the studio for the remainder of the season. He is known for using the phrase "spurtability" as a reference to a team's ability to score points in quick succession.

Kellogg replaced Billy Packer as CBS' lead basketball game analyst beginning in the 2008–2009 college basketball season and called the 2009 NCAA men's basketball championship with Jim Nantz. He also worked games at the beginning of the season with Verne Lundquist when Nantz was on other CBS Sports duties including the NFL and golf.

In March 2010, Kellogg played a game of H.O.R.S.E. against U.S. President Barack Obama. The game, called "P.O.T.U.S." for the occasion, was won by Obama, who had P.O.T.U. to Kellogg's P.O.T.U.S.

During the 2012 NCAA men's tournament, the Ohio Bobcats, for whom Kellogg's son, Nick, played, advanced to the Sweet Sixteen round with a win over South Florida in Nashville. At the same time Kellogg was calling another tournament game, the Lehigh – Xavier game almost 500 miles away in Greensboro, North Carolina. Kellogg, in a digression from his impartiality as a commentator, exclaimed "Way to go Bobcats!" when the final score rolled on his monitor.

In 2014, Kellogg returned to his previous role as a studio analyst. In return, Greg Anthony (who himself had been a studio analyst since 2008) took over Kellogg's role as lead college basketball game analyst.

NBA 2K announcer
Kellogg appeared in the popular NBA video game NBA 2K9 as the co-commentator alongside Kevin Harlan. The pair rejoined for future games in the series; they have appeared in every game since.

See also
 Coach Wooden "Keys to Life" Award

References

1961 births
Living people
20th-century African-American sportspeople
21st-century African-American people
African-American basketball players
African-American Christians
American men's basketball players
Basketball players from Cleveland
College basketball announcers in the United States
Indiana Pacers announcers
Indiana Pacers draft picks
Indiana Pacers players
McDonald's High School All-Americans
Ohio State Buckeyes men's basketball players
Ohio State University trustees
Parade High School All-Americans (boys' basketball)
Power forwards (basketball)